Ole T. Ramsland (1854–1930) was an American politician, who served in the Minnesota House of Representatives from 1905 to 1907. A Democrat, he represented District 22.

A resident of Sacred Heart, where he owned a general store, Ramsland also served on the local school board and the village council. He married Julia A. Thompson (1861–1896) and, after Julia's early death, Inger Leonora Arestad (1870–1947), both fellow Norwegians.

His son Magnus married Sarah McEwen, the granddaughter of Minnesota state representative Charles D. McEwen, in 1906. The couple later moved to the Canadian province of Saskatchewan, where they were among the founding settlers of the village of Buchanan and both later served in the Legislative Assembly of Saskatchewan.

References

External links
Ramsland, Ole T. at the Minnesota Legislative Reference Library

1854 births
1930 deaths
Democratic Party members of the Minnesota House of Representatives
Norwegian emigrants to the United States
People from Sogn og Fjordane
People from Sacred Heart, Minnesota